My Wife Makes Music is an East German musical film directed by Hans Heinrich. It was released in 1958, and sold 6,052,050 tickets. It was shot at the Babelsberg Studios in Potsdam. The film's set's were designed by the art director Oskar Pietsch.

The film was very popular at the box office, but drew criticism from East Germany's communist authorities who regarded its style as too close to western commercial cinema.

Synopsis
It was a revue film in which an East Berlin housewife is discovered and turned into a singing star by an Italian, much to her husband's disapproval.

Cast
 Lore Frisch as Gerda Wagner
 Günther Simon as Gustl Wagner
 Maly Delschaft as Susi Rettig
 Alice Prill as Eva Rettig
 Herbert Kiper as Fritz Rettig
 Evelyn Künneke as Daisy
 Alexander Hegarth as Fabiani
 Manon Damann as Soloist Ballett der Komischen Oper Berlin
 Walter E. Fuß as Barmixer
 Guido Goroll as Mann in Loge
 Klaus Gross
 Paul Heidemann as Direktor Nielsen
 Paul R. Henker as U-Bahn-Kontrolleur
 Werner Höllein as Soloist Ballett der Komischen Oper
 Katina Imme as Katharina
 Hans Klering as Hutkäufer
 Ruth Kommerell as Verkäuferin am Papierwarenstand
 Else Korén as Frau des Hutkäufers
 Genia Lapuhs
 Mario Lerch as Francesco
 Werner Lierck as Kunde
 Gitta Lind
 Alfred Maack as Pförtner
 Vladimir Marof as Ballettsolist der Komischen Oper Berlin
 Ingeborg Naß
 Kurt Schmidtchen as Arthur Papke
 Heinz Schubert as Spießer
 Lou Seitz as Jette
 Friedrich Teitge as Bühnenarbeiter
 Nico Turoff

References

Bibliography
 Feinstein, Joshua. The Triumph of the Ordinary: Depictions of Daily Life in the East German Cinema, 1949–1989. University of North Carolina Press, 2002.

External links
 

1958 films
East German films
Films set in Berlin
German musical films
1958 musical films
1950s German-language films
Films about singers
Films directed by Hans Heinrich
1950s German films
Films shot at Babelsberg Studios